Gaon may refer to

 Gaon (Hebrew), a non-formal title given to certain Jewish Rabbis
 Geonim, presidents of the two great Talmudic Academies of Sura and Pumbedita
 Vilna Gaon, known as the Gaon of Vilnius.
 Gaon Music Chart, record chart in South Korea
 Yehoram Gaon, Israeli singer
 Gaon (film), a 2018 Indian drama film
 Gaon (restaurant), a Michelin 3-starred restaurant in Seoul, South Korea since 2017